Mansour Bahrami and Fabrice Santoro were the defending champions, but were eliminated in the round robin competition.

Sergi Bruguera and Goran Ivanišević won the title, defeating Mikael Pernfors and Mats Wilander in the final, 6–2, 4–6, [10–4].

Draw

Final

Group C
Standings are determined by: 1. number of wins; 2. number of matches; 3. in three-players-ties, percentage of sets won, or of games won; 4. steering-committee decision.

Group D
Standings are determined by: 1. number of wins; 2. number of matches; 3. in three-players-ties, percentage of sets won, or of games won; 4. steering-committee decision.

References
Main Draw

Legends Over 45 Doubles